James Hurst may refer to:

James Hurst (1922–2013), author of "The Scarlet Ibis"
James Hurst (politician) (1880–1964), Tasmanian politician
James Hurst (footballer) (born 1992), English footballer
James Hurst (baseball) (born 1967), former Major League Baseball pitcher
James Hurst (American football) (born 1991), American football offensive tackle
James Willard Hurst (1910–1997), American legal history scholar
James Hurst (screenwriter), Canadian television producer and writer
Jim Hurst, American guitarist

See also
Hurst (disambiguation)